Steve Coombs is a former professional wrestler best known for his stint in Xtreme Pro Wrestling. Coombs competed primarily as "The Gigolo" Steve Rizzono. At one time, Rizzono was also a bouncer and a personal trainer.

Professional wrestling career
Steve Rizzono trained alongside Spike Dudley at All Pro Wrestling's school, and made his debut on March 29, 1995, teaming with Mike Modest against Robert Thompson and Mike Diamond. While competing in APW, he captured the APW Tag Team titles with Mike Modest and Tony Jones. He also won a famous three-way dance that featured Vic Grimes and Erin O' Grady.  On January 22, 1996 in Stockton, CA, Rizzono made his World Wrestling Federation debut in a losing effort to Justin "Hawk" Bradshaw. The following night in Oakland, Rizzono jobbed to Duke "The Dumpster" Droese in a match that was featured on the WWF Superstars TV program.

On the weekend of ECW’s November to Remember 1997 pay-per-view, Rizzono had a match with Robert Thompson on an APW show. Wrestling Observer journalist Dave Meltzer attended both shows. A few weeks later, Meltzer wrote in the observer that Rizzono's match with Thompson was better than almost anything he saw on the ECW event. In between his APW stint and his early 2000 entrance into XPW, Rizzono wrestled in the United States Wrestling Association and for independent promotions based in the Portland area.  In Portland, Rizzono was managed by Jonny Fairplay.

Upon joining XPW, Rizzono initially had a partnership with Kid Kaos, but it quickly escalated into a bitter rivalry. At one point, Rizzono was managed by "Playboy" Buddy Rose, in an unsuccessful journey after the XPW World Heavyweight Championship.  During his early tenure, he had matches against Public Enemy, John Kronus, and Juventud Guerrera. He was a member of The Black Army, and (following his banishment from the Army) founded The Enterprise with manager and porn star Veronica Caine, in order to avenge the rejection from his former teammates.  Besides feuding with the Black Army, Rizzono feuded heavily with Pogo the Clown, as Rizzono was usually privy to receiving harsh beatings from Pogo. Their feud was featured in two (2001 and 2002) of XPW's annual King of the Deathmatch Tournaments, as both matches began as singles matches, but soon turned into triple threat matches midway through.  In both bouts, Rizzono fell victim to brutal and memorable beatings from his nemesis, which resulted in Rizzono savagely losing in both of his appearances.  Rizzono departed from XPW in mid-2002 when XPW relocated its operations to the Pennsylvania area on the East Coast.

Rizzono returned to APW on November 8, 2002
as a trainer, a commentator, and a manager before leaving the business.  He currently resides in California and he has health problems due to the severe injuries he incurred in XPW, including multiple concussions and broken noses as a result of death matches in which he participated.  On July 18, 2007, Steve received spinal surgery in which two ligaments were removed from his spine.

Championships and accomplishments
All Pro Wrestling
APW Tag Team Championship (2 times) – with Mike Modest (1) and Tony Jones (1)
NWA: Extreme Canadian Championship Wrestling
NWA/ECCW Tag Team Championship (1 time) – with Chance Beckett
NWA/ECCW Vancouver Island Heavyweight Championship (1 time)

Media
Video and DVD appearances
XPW: After the Fall. Perf. Steve Rizzono. DVD. Big Vision Entertainment, 2006.
XPW: Retribution. Perf. Steve Rizzono. DVD. Xtreme Pro Wrestling, 2003.
XPW: Best of XPW TV, Vol. 1. Perf. Steve Rizzono. DVD. Xtreme Pro Wrestling, 2003.
XPW: Best of The Enterprise. Perf. Steve Rizzono. DVD. Xtreme Pro Wrestling, 2002.
XPW Class-X Presents: XPW Baptized in Blood, Vol. 1 & 2. Perf. Steve Rizzono. DVD. Big Vision Entertainment, 2007.
XPW Class-X Presents: XPW TV The Complete First Season. Perf. Steve Rizzono. DVD. Big Vision Entertainment, 2007.
XPW: New Year's Revolution. Perf. Steve Rizzono. DVD. Xtreme Pro Wrestling, 2002.
XPW: Blown To Hell. Perf. Steve Rizzono. DVD. Xtreme Pro Wrestling, 2002.
XPW: Liberty or Death. Perf. Steve Rizzono. DVD. Xtreme Pro Wrestling, 2002.
XPW: Baptized In Blood 2. Perf. Steve Rizzono. DVD. Xtreme Pro Wrestling, 2002.
XPW: Baptized In Blood 3: Night of Champions. Perf. Steve Rizzono. DVD. Xtreme Pro Wrestling, 2002.
XPW: Free Fall. Perf. Steve Rizzono. DVD. Xtreme Pro Wrestling, 2002.
XPW: Genocide. Perf. Steve Rizzono. DVD. Xtreme Pro Wrestling, 2002.
XPW: Best of The Black Army. Perf. Steve Rizzono. DVD. Xtreme Pro Wrestling, 2002.
XPW: Damage Inc.. Perf. Steve Rizzono. DVD. Xtreme Pro Wrestling, 2001.
XPW: Redemption. Perf. Steve Rizzono. DVD. Xtreme Pro Wrestling, 2001.
XPW: Go Funk Yourself. Perf. Steve Rizzono. DVD. Xtreme Pro Wrestling, 2001.
XPW: We Wrestle. Perf. Steve Rizzono. VHS. Xtreme Pro Wrestling, 2001.

Film and television appearances
Nash Bridges. CBS. Jan. 2001.
Obscenery. Executive Producer Melissa Wegman. ClearVision Media Production Group. XPW archive footage appearance.
"Pornographer runs for Los Angeles mayor." Extra TV. Syndication. July 2000. "XPW archive footage appearance."

References

Further reading
Ginzburg, Evan. Steve Rizzono interview. Wrestling - Then & Now<. Issue #165.
Goldsmith, Susan. Mortal Combat. The East Bay Express<. January 14, 2004.
Howell, Brian. One Ring Circus: Extreme Wrestling in the Minor Leagues. Vancouver: Arsenal Pulp Press, 2002. 
Hunt, Don. Pro show at Armory brings out the beast in fans. The Mail Tribune July 2, 1999.
Hunt, Don. Racing will be a real drag tonight. The Mail Tribune August 3, 1999.
Hunt, Don. Wrestling: tights, fights, a ringside night.The Mail Tribune June 30, 1999.
Meyers, Michelle. In Pursuit of a Dream. The Alameda Times-Star, The Oakland Tribune. October 20, 2003.
Rodgers, Mike. Steve Rizzono interview. Ring Around the Northwest newsletter. 2005.
Saito, Fumi. Article and photo gallery on XPW’s second King of the Deathmatch Tournament. Baseball Magazine Japanese language. February 2001.
Spotlight on All Pro Wrestling. The Fremont Argus October 19, 2003.

External links
Steve Rizzono at CageMatch.net
Steve Rizzono at Genickbruch.com
Steve Rizzono at WrestleZone.ru

American male professional wrestlers
Living people
Sportspeople from Camden, New Jersey
Sportspeople from California
American exercise instructors
Professional wrestling announcers
Professional wrestling managers and valets
Bodyguards
1970 births